Dorocordulia, commonly called little emeralds or little barlasses, is a genus of dragonfly in the family Corduliidae found in North America.

Species
Dorocordulia lepida  – petite emerald
Dorocordulia libera  – racket-tailed emerald

References

External links

Dorocordulia, DiscoverLife
Dorocordulia, BugGuide
Dorocordulia, EoL

Corduliidae
Odonata of North America
Anisoptera genera
Taxa named by James George Needham